Arja Nuolioja (born 1 December 1968) is a Finnish ski-orienteering competitor and world champion.

She received an individual gold medal in the short distance, and a bronze medal in the long course at the 1996 World Ski Orienteering Championships in Lillehammer.

She finished first overall in the World Cup in Ski Orienteering in 1993 and 1995.

See also
 Finnish orienteers
 List of orienteers
 List of orienteering events

References

1968 births
Living people
Finnish orienteers
Female orienteers
Ski-orienteers